Courtney Loves Dallas is an American reality television series that premiered December 5, 2013, on Bravo. Announced in August 2012, Courtney Loves Dallas chronicles the adventures of Courtney Kerr as she socializes, continues to start her new career, and looks for her future husband. The series is a spin-off of Most Eligible Dallas.

Episodes

References

2010s American reality television series
2013 American television series debuts
2014 American television series endings
English-language television shows
Television shows set in Dallas
Bravo (American TV network) original programming
American television spin-offs
Reality television spin-offs